Fatma Uruk (born in 1988) is a Turkish world record holder female free-diver and school teacher.

Early life
Fatma Uruk was born in İzmir, Turkey in 1988. Between 2006 and 2013, she was educated in Economics at Middle East Technical University in Ankara.

Sports career
She began with freediving after she watched a documentary about the Turkish world-record holder female freediver Yasemin Dalkılıç. In 2008, she felt herself ready for competitions, and participated in the Turkish championship. She won the third place, and was admitted to the national team.

By November the same year, she broke three world records in three days in Mexico.

World records
VNF   – 2020
VNF   – 2020
CWT  – 2020

References

1988 births
Living people
Sportspeople from İzmir
Middle East Technical University alumni
Turkish freedivers
Turkish sportswomen